Donnie R. Sellers, Sr. (born November 20, 1944 in Norwalk, Connecticut) is a former Democratic member of the Connecticut House of Representatives from Norwalk, Connecticut's 140th assembly district. He resigned his seat in February 1997. He was concurrently serving on the Norwalk Common Council and was an active policeman as well.

Early life 
He is a graduate of the University of New Haven, with a B.S. in political science. He joined the Norwalk Police Department in 1966. He is a member of the United States Army Reserves since 1972.

Political career 
In 1989, he was the first petition candidate to win his district and the first police officer to serve on the Norwalk Common Council.

In January 1993, he won election to the Connecticut House in a special election beating Republican Eleni Sotiriou by a 2-to-1 margin while running with the endorsements of the Democratic Party and A Connecticut Party. The special election was called when Representative Doug Mintz resigned to become a Superior Court judge.

He was re-elected to the Connecticut House on Nov. 8, 1994, having beaten Republican challenger, Fabian Vega.

Sellers left office in 1997 after pleading guilty to receiving a $200 bribe to write a letter of recommendation for a gun permit. In 1998, he attempted to regain his seat, but due to mistakes in the filing of petitions was unable to force a primary challenge. He also tried to regain a seat on the Norwalk Common Council, but was again unable to, due to mistakes in the filing of petitions. He was successfully able to force a primary in 2002, but was defeated in a three way race by Joseph Clemmons.

Associations 
 Fair Housing Rent Commissioner
 Neighborhood Housing Services
 NEON Christian Community Action Group
 Board of Directors, George Washington Carver
 Commissioner, Boy Scouts of America

References

External links 
 Project Vote Smart

1944 births
Living people
Connecticut city council members
Democratic Party members of the Connecticut House of Representatives
Politicians from Norwalk, Connecticut
Police officers convicted of accepting bribes
United States Army reservists
African-American police officers
American police officers
African-American state legislators in Connecticut
21st-century African-American people
20th-century African-American people